Samuel "Sammy" Silke is a fictional character in the Marvel Comics universe, appearing in the series Daredevil. He is the son of one of the antagonist Kingpin's friends and associates. His appearance is based on artist Alex Maleev.

Samuel Silke was also portrayed by Peter Gerety in the first season of the Marvel Television production streaming television series Daredevil, set in the Marvel Cinematic Universe (MCU).

Publication history
Samuel Silke first appeared in Daredevil Vol. 2 #26 and was created by Brian Michael Bendis and Alex Maleev.

Fictional character biography
As a child, Samuel Silke was close friends with Richard Fisk, son of the Kingpin, Wilson Fisk. The two discovered that their fathers worked for the Mafia, but it was only when Richard was a young adult that he learned his father was the Kingpin. Following some serious, unknown error in Chicago, Silke was allowed by the organization to join the crew of the then-blind Kingpin as a favor to Silke's father. Years later, Matt Murdock was giving Silke's father's organization problems, so Silke asked Fisk to take care of it for him. Fisk denied the request, saying Murdock was not to be touched and refused to elaborate any further. This angered Silke immensely. Richard Fisk revealed to Silke that he and the rest of the Kingpin's crew knew that the Kingpin knew that Murdock was in fact Daredevil. Silke orchestrated a coup with Richard Fisk, going against the Kingpin's rule by ordering an assassination attempt on Murdock in the Kingpin's name.

The climax of Silke's plan came was when he and the rest of Kingpin's men orchestrated a Julius Caesar-like attack on Kingpin, stabbing him several times and leaving him for dead. With Kingpin out of the way, Silke planned on uniting and running New York's underworld.

However, Silke bit off more than he could chew. Kingpin survived the assassination attempt and was carried out of the country by Vanessa Fisk, his wife. Vanessa then got back at Silke's men, having them killed and killing Richard herself.

Silke fled to the FBI, begging for protection. He wouldn't give any info on his father, but he did give the one thing he had....Daredevil's identity. One of the FBI agents he told it to would later sell it to the tabloids, effectively destroying Daredevil's life.

Silke was brought to a minimum-security prison a bitter and sullen man, bemoaning to the other convicts about how he almost had everything at his fingertips. He was later told by a guard that his father had come to visit him. But when Silke got there, someone else was waiting for him: The Kingpin. Wilson Fisk crushed Silke's head to a pulp, finally getting his revenge. FBI Agent Henry Driver reported what had happened to Silke.

Powers and abilities
Silke was proficient in the knowledge and usage of various knives and guns.

In other media
Silke briefly appears in a flashback early in season 1 of Daredevil, where he is played by Peter Gerety. He is Roscoe Sweeney's right-hand man and the two are responsible for strong-arming Jack Murdock into taking a dive to boxer Carl "The Crusher" Creel.

References

External links
 Samuel Silke at Marvel.com
 Samuel Silke at Marvel Wiki
 Samuel Silke at Comic Vine

Characters created by Brian Michael Bendis
Characters created by Alex Maleev
Comics characters introduced in 2001
Fictional gangsters
Fictional murderers
Marvel Comics supervillains